Charles Voyde Harrelson (July 23, 1941 – March 15, 2007) was an American hitman and organized crime figure who was convicted of assassinating federal judge John H. Wood Jr., the first federal judge to be assassinated in the 20th century. Charles Harrelson was the father of actors Brett and Woody Harrelson.

Personal life
Charles Harrelson was born on July 23rd, 1938, in Lovelady, Texas, the son of Alma Lee (née Sparks; 1907–2002) and Voyde Harrelson (1901–1976).

He was married to Nancy Hillman Harrelson, Diane Lou Oswald, Jo Ann Harrelson, and Gina Adelle Foster. Harrelson worked as an encyclopedia salesman in California, and as a professional gambler. In 1960, he was convicted of armed robbery. Harrelson later admitted that he had been involved in dozens of murders beginning in the early 1960s.

Harrelson's son, Woodrow Tracy Harrelson (born July 23, 1961), became a television and film actor, known as Woody Harrelson. According to Woody, his father disappeared from the family's home in Houston in 1968, leaving his wife Diane to raise Woody and his two brothers. Woody lost track of his father until 1981, when news broke of Harrelson's arrest for the murder of Judge Wood. During an interview in November 1988, Woody revealed that he visited his father regularly in federal prison, though he still harbored mixed feelings about him, saying my father is one of the most articulate, well-read, charming people I've ever known. Still, I'm just now gauging whether he merits my loyalty or friendship. I look at him as someone who could be a friend more than someone who was a father.

Murder of Alan Harry Berg
Defended by Percy Foreman, Harrelson was tried for the 1968 murder of Alan Harry Berg. On September 22, 1970, he was acquitted by a jury in Angleton, Texas. The murder is chronicled in the memoir Run Brother Run by the victim's brother, David Berg.

Murder of Sam Degelia
Harrelson was tried for the 1968 murder-for-hire killing of Sam Degelia Jr., a resident of Hearne, Texas. Harrelson was paid $2,000 (the equivalent of $ in 2020) for the murder of Degelia, a grain dealer and father of four who was killed in McAllen, Texas. His first trial ended with a deadlocked jury, although Pete Scamardo was also tried in the case, found guilty of being an accomplice to the murder, and sentenced to seven years' probation. Harrelson was retried in 1973, convicted, and sentenced to 15 years in prison. In 1978, after serving five years, he was released early for good behavior.

Murder of Judge John H. Wood Jr.
Shortly after Harrelson was paroled in 1978, he and his then-wife, Jo Ann, were implicated in another murder. On May 29, 1979, U.S. District Judge John H. Wood Jr. was shot dead in the parking lot outside his San Antonio, Texas, townhouse. Harrelson was convicted of killing Judge Wood after being hired by drug dealer Jamiel Chagra of El Paso, Texas. Wood—nicknamed "Maximum John" because of his reputation for handing down long sentences for drug offenses—was originally scheduled to have Chagra appear before him on the day of his murder, but the trial had been delayed.

Harrelson was apprehended when calls were made to the police as he was firing a gun at imaginary FBI agents while on drugs. With the aid of an anonymous tip and a tape recording of a conversation that occurred during a visit from Joe Chagra to his brother Jamiel Chagra in prison, Harrelson was charged with Judge Wood's murder. Harrelson claimed at trial that he did not kill Judge Wood, but merely took credit for it so he could claim a large payment from Chagra.

Harrelson was sentenced to two life terms based largely on Chagra's conversation with his brother from prison. Both Harrelson and Joe Chagra were implicated in the assassination, and Chagra received a ten-year sentence as part of a plea bargain to testify for the prosecution but not against his brother. In the absence of Joe's testimony, Jamiel Chagra was acquitted of the murder. Jamiel was represented by future mayor of Las Vegas, Oscar Goodman, then a public defender. In a plea bargain, Jamiel admitted to his role in the murder of Judge Wood and to the attempted murder of a U.S. attorney. Harrelson's wife, Jo Ann, was sentenced to consecutive terms totaling 25 years on multiple convictions of conspiracy and perjury related to the assassination.

In 2003, Chagra recanted his previous statements, stating that someone other than Harrelson had shot Judge Wood. Harrelson's son, Woody, then attempted to have his father's conviction overturned in order to secure a new trial, though without success. Chagra died in July 2008 of cancer.

Allegations of involvement in the assassination of John F. Kennedy

In September 1980, Harrelson surrendered to police after a six-hour standoff in which he was reportedly high on cocaine. During the standoff, he threatened suicide, stating that he had killed both Judge Wood and President John F. Kennedy. In a television interview after his arrest, Harrelson said: "At the same time I said I had killed the judge, I said I had killed Kennedy, which might give you an idea to the state of my mind at the time." He said that the statements made during the standoff were "an effort to elongate my life."

Joseph Chagra later testified during Harrelson's trial that Harrelson claimed to have shot Kennedy and drew maps to show where he was hiding during the assassination. Chagra said that he did not believe Harrelson's claim, and the AP reported that the FBI "apparently discounted any involvement by Harrelson in the Kennedy assassination." According to Jim Marrs' 1989 book Crossfire, Harrelson is believed to be the youngest and tallest of the "three tramps" by many conspiracy theorists. Marrs stated that Harrelson was involved "with criminals connected to intelligence agencies and the military" and suggested that he was connected to Jack Ruby through Russell Douglas Matthews, a third party with links to organized crime who was known to both Harrelson and Ruby. Lois Gibson, a well-known forensic artist, matched photographs of Harrelson to the photographs of the youngest-looking of the three "tramps".

In 1982 Harrelson told Dallas TV station KDFW-TV, "Do you believe that Lee Harvey Oswald killed President Kennedy, alone, without any aid from a rogue agency of the US government or at least a portion of that agency?  I believe you are very naïve if you do."

Escape attempt

On July 4, 1995, Harrelson and two other inmates, Gary Settle and Michael Rivers, attempted to escape from the Atlanta Federal Penitentiary using a makeshift rope. A warning shot was fired at them from the prison's tower, and the trio surrendered. Harrelson was subsequently transferred to supermax prison ADX Florence in Colorado. In a letter to a friend, Harrelson wrote that he enjoyed his life inside the maximum security facility, writing that "there are not enough hours in a day for my needs as a matter of fact ... The silence is wonderful."

Death
On March 15, 2007, Harrelson was found dead in his cell, having died at the age of 68 from a heart attack.

Media
A 10-episode podcast titled Son of a Hitman was released on May 5, 2020, by Spotify Studios in partnership with Tradecraft Media and in association with High Five Content. It is produced and hosted by journalist Jason Cavanagh and investigates the legitimacy of the three murder charges Charles Harrelson was tried for as well as the possibility that he may have been involved with the assassination of President John F. Kennedy.

References

1938 births
2007 deaths
20th-century American criminals
American gangsters
American people who died in prison custody
Contract killers
Criminals from Texas
Inmates of ADX Florence
American assassins
People associated with the assassination of John F. Kennedy
People from Walker County, Texas
Prisoners who died in United States federal government detention
People from Houston County, Texas
American male criminals